Judi’s House was founded by Brian Griese in honor and in memory of his mother, Judi Griese, who died from breast cancer when Brian was twelve years old. Judi Griese was the wife of former Miami Dolphins star, Bob Griese.

Judi Griese died in 1988 after a six-year battle with breast cancer. In his book, Undefeated, co-written with his father, Brian recalled that he felt he had nowhere to turn to with his grief. He reported that he did not want to burden his father, as he was dealing with his own grief at the time. (Bob Griese had also lost his father when he was ten years old).

While playing for the Denver Broncos, Brian Griese established a house where children could meet with support groups and counselors. Griese named it Judi's House, and placed a picture of Judi over the fireplace. The house features rooms where children could create art or become physically active as they dealt with their grief. Judi's House is located in Denver, Colorado, and more than 6,000 children and their adult caregivers from the metro area have participated since it opened in 2002.

External links
 Official site

References

Houses in Denver
Non-profit organizations based in Colorado
Organizations based in Denver
2002 establishments in Colorado